Anthidium loti is a Palearctic species of bee in the family Megachilidae, the leaf-cutter, carder, or mason bees.

Synonyms
Synonyms for this species include:
Apis variegata_homonym Fabricius, 1781
Apis varia_homonym Gmelin, 1790
Anthidium regulare Eversmann, 1852
Anthidium mosaicum Costa, 1863
Anthidium meridionale Giraud, 1863
Anthidium quadriseriatum Kriechbaumer, 1873
Anthidium variegatum var meridionale Giraud, 1863
Anthidium (Anthidium) loti meridionale Giraud, 1863

References

loti
Insects described in 1852